Seconds is a release by rock band The Dogs D'Amour. The album was available as part of a limited edition "Dogs Dinner" boxet in 2000, that was sold as part of the fanclub in conjunction with the independent release of "Happy Ever After".

Track listing
 "The Girl"  	
 "Jewel"  	
 "Won't You Let Go"  	
 "She Died Before She Got Young"  	
 "Gone Are All the Angels"  	
 "Damnation"  	
 "Stealing from the Devil"	
 "Superstition Highway"  	
 "Fun"  	
 "Forgotten"  	
 "Phantom (Run to Me)"

Band
Tyla - vocals, guitars
Bam Ross - drums, percussion
Jo "Dog" Almeida - guitars, slide, backing vocals
Share Ross - bass, keys

2000 albums
The Dogs D'Amour albums